Varazq (also Romanized as Varzaq and Vorazq; also known as Vārāz and Wārāz) is a village in Qaen Rural District, in the Central District of Qaen County, South Khorasan Province, Iran. At the 2006 census, its population was 95, in 39 families.

References 

Populated places in Qaen County